Thailand competed at the 1968 Summer Olympics in Mexico City, Mexico. 41 competitors, all men, took part in 18 events in 6 sports.

Boxing

Men's Flyweight
Prapan Duangchaoom

Men's Bantamweight
Cherdchai Udompaichitkul

Men's Light Welterweight
Niyom Prasertsom

Cycling

Seven cyclists represented Thailand in 1968.

Individual road race
 Somchai Chantarasamrit
 Suriyong Hemint
 Somkuan Seehapant
 Chainarong Sophonpong

Sprint
 Pakanit Boriharnvanakhet
 Kriengsak Varavudhi

1000m time trial
 Pakanit Boriharnvanakhet

Individual pursuit
 Pakanit Boriharnvanakhet

Team pursuit
 Pakanit Boriharnvanakhet
 Somchai Chantarasamrit
 Boontom Prasongquamdee
 Chainarong Sophonpong

Football

Sailing

Shooting

Eleven shooters, all men, represented Thailand in 1968.

25 m pistol
 Rangsit Yanothai
 Taweesak Kasiwat

50 m pistol
 Sutham Aswanit
 Amorn Yuktanandana

50 m rifle, three positions
 Charumai Mahawat
 Vinich Chareonsiri

50 m rifle, prone
 Udomsak Theinthong
 Choomphol Chaiyanitr

Trap
 Pavitr Kachasanee
 Dipya Mongkollugsana

Skeet
 Boonkua Lourvanij

Weightlifting

References

External links
Official Olympic Reports

Nations at the 1968 Summer Olympics
1968 Summer Olympics
1968 in Thai sport